PCI domain containing 2 is a protein that in humans is encoded by the PCID2 gene.

Function

This gene encodes a component of the TREX-2 complex (transcription and export complex 2), which regulates mRNA export from the nucleus. This protein regulates expression of Mad2 mitotic arrest deficient-like 1, a cell division checkpoint protein. This protein also interacts with and stabilizes Brca2 (breast cancer 2) protein. Alternative splicing results in multiple transcript variants. [provided by RefSeq, Mar 2016].

References

Further reading